The 1983–84 Cypriot Third Division was the 13th season of the Cypriot third-level football league. Adonis Idaliou won their 2nd title.

Format
Thirteen teams participated in the 1983–84 Cypriot Third Division. All teams played against each other twice, once at their home and once away. The team with the most points at the end of the season crowned champions. The first two teams were promoted to 1984–85 Cypriot Second Division.

Point system
Teams received two points for a win, one point for a draw and zero points for a loss.

League standings

Sources

See also
 Cypriot Third Division
 1983–84 Cypriot First Division
 1983–84 Cypriot Cup

Cypriot Third Division seasons
Cyprus
1983–84 in Cypriot football